CW 1 may refer to:

In astronomy:
(5209) 1989 CW1, a Jupiter Trojan minor planet
(48605) 1995 CW1,a main-belt minor planet
(65896) 1998 CW1, a main-belt minor planet

In other uses:
CW-1 Junior, a 1930s American a light sports aircraft
CW1, a postcode district in the CW postcode area in Cheshire, England
 CW-1 visa, a non-immigrant visa which allows travel to United States for temporary workers to be employed in the Commonwealth of the Northern Mariana Islands
The Cold War, on the grounds of a second